Jericho, Indiana was a village in Jefferson Township, Tipton County, Indiana, United States.

Description
The community was located in the southern part of Jefferson Township, just north of Ekin. It was founded by Jerry Dunn and Caswell Boxley. It was platted but lots were never purchased and the village never came into fruition before being abandoned.

See also

 List of ghost towns in Indiana

References

Geography of Tipton County, Indiana
Former populated places in Indiana